Moult-Argences is a train station in Moult, Calvados, Normandy, France. It is on the Mantes-la-Jolie to Cherbourg railway. It is served by regular trains to Caen and Lisieux and once a day by a train to Évreux and to Cherbourg.

The station is also served by Bus Verts du Calvados line 16 to Caen and Méry-Corbon.

References

Railway stations in Calvados